The Annapolis Conference was a Middle East peace conference held on 27 November 2007, at the United States Naval Academy in Annapolis, Maryland, United States. The conference aimed to revive the Israeli–Palestinian peace process and implement the "Roadmap for peace". The conference ended with the issuing of a joint statement from all parties. After the Annapolis Conference, the negotiations were continued.

Attendees

The United States organized and hosted the conference. Palestinian President Mahmoud Abbas, Israeli Prime Minister Ehud Olmert, and U.S. President George W. Bush attended the meeting. A partial list of over 40 invitees was released on 20 November 2007, including China, the Arab League, Russia, the European Union and the United Nations; most of whom accepted the invitation.

Objectives and background

The conference aimed to revive the Peace process and gather broad international support. The objective was to restart negotiations on a final status agreement that addresses all core issues, and the establishment of a Palestinian state through the Roadmap for peace. A draft document was leaked by Haaretz before the conference, with the final and forthcoming Annapolis Joint Declaration expected to outline the scope of what will eventually be final peace talks.

President Abbas and Prime Minister Olmert had six meetings since June 2007 to try to agree on some basic issues ahead of the summit. A final round of discussions between Olmert and Abbas was held in Washington D.C. on 26 November 2007, the day prior to the conference. After the Annapolis Conference, the negotiations were continued.

Positions

Americans
Secretary of State Condoleezza Rice visited the Middle East on a four-day tour of shuttle diplomacy in mid-October to shore up support for the summit, and hinted at the General Assembly of the United Jewish Communities (GA), in Nashville, Tennessee on 13 November 2007, that Israelis are prepared to give up the West Bank in exchange for peace.  This was Rice's 8th visit to the region during the Bush Administration.

Palestinian

Abbas stated that a clear agenda was necessary for the conference. He demanded a Palestinian state comprising an area equal to the territory of the West Bank and Gaza Strip. He further demanded that all six central issues be debated at the conference: Jerusalem, refugees and right of return, borders, settlements, water and security.

Abbas said that he hoped to reach an agreement with Israel by the end of November 2007, which Abbas would then put to a referendum. Furthermore, he expressed his hope that a final agreement with Israel would be possible within six months of the conference.

Israeli
In October 2007, Prime Minister Olmert indicated that he would be willing to give up parts of East Jerusalem as part of a broader peace settlement at Annapolis, drawing considerable criticism from right-wing Israeli and foreign Jewish organizations and Christian Zionists.

On 27 November 2007, Ovadia Yosef, the spiritual leader of the Shas party, announced that his party would leave the government coalition, thereby ending the coalition's majority in the Knesset, if Ehud Olmert agreed to divide Jerusalem. Shas minister Eli Yishai explained: "Jerusalem is above all political considerations. I will not help enable concessions on Jerusalem." Olmert's ability to follow through on his earlier comments about concessions in East Jerusalem is therefore in question.

Opening

Prior to the conference, President Bush met with Israeli and Palestinian leaders in the White House. After meeting with Olmert and Abbas, President Bush read from a joint statement, signed by both parties, supporting a Two-State Solution. "We agreed to immediately launch good faith, bilateral negotiations in order to conclude a peace treaty resolving all outstanding issues, including core issues, without exception," and that, "The final peace settlement will establish Palestine as a homeland for the Palestinian people just as Israel is the homeland for the Jewish people."

Result
A joint understanding, read by US president George Bush, stated that  "In furtherance of the goal of two states, Israel and Palestine, living side by side in peace and security" the parties agreed to"immediately launch good-faith bilateral negotiations in order to conclude a peace treaty, resolving all outstanding issues, including all core issues without exception, as specified in previous agreements". A steering committee would meet from 12 December 2007, followed by biweekly negotiations between President Abbas and Prime Minister Olmert.

The parties also committed to immediately implement their respective obligations under the Roadmap for peace and to continue the implementation of it until they had reached a peace treaty, to be concluded before the end of 2008.

Reaction

Protests and boycotts
Hamas and Grand Ayatollah Ali Khamenei of Iran called for a boycott of the conference, and on November 23 Hamas held a demonstration in the Gaza Strip. In the West Bank, large demonstrations opposed to the conference were quelled heavy-handedly, and demonstrators were beaten by Fatah militants. The president of Iran, Mahmoud Ahmadinejad, denounced the event, stating that it was "A political show for the media which is in Israel's interest".

On the other hand, Jewish activists and organizations opposed to Israel's concession in a peace settlement of any part of Jerusalem or the West Bank became increasingly vocal against the Olmert government, with protests in front of Israeli embassies in New York and Washington D.C. during the summit. On 27 November 2007, Rabbi Dov Lior of the Yesha Rabbis Council called an "emergency meeting" in order to discuss the upcoming conference. During the meeting, Lior stated: "No leader, in any generation, has the right to give away Eretz Israel ... we call on the Jews abroad, and especially on community leaders and rabbis, to join us in our efforts against this treaty and its implications. ... Together, we will save the people of Israel from the government's terrible plan." Lior further stated that peace would only be achieved by "[cleansing] the country of Arabs and [resettling] them in the countries where they came from."
A number of large mainstream American Jewish and Christian  groups joined together with a majority of Knesset to oppose any negotiation that would include altering Jerusalem's status. They formed the Coordinating Council on Jerusalem.

Support
Organizations that approved of the conference also mobilized and prepared to demonstrate their support for the summit. The United Nations prepared a resolution to be adopted by the Security Council on November 30, 2007, expressing support for the outcome of the conference. The resolution was withdrawn after Israel raised complaints.  In addition to Israel's complaints, the Palestinian Authority also said it wasn't interested in a resolution, according to UN sources.

See also
 One-state solution
 Two-state solution
 Three-state solution

References

External links

 Joint Understanding Read by President Bush at Annapolis Conference

2007 in Syria
2007 in Israel
Israeli–Palestinian peace process
Mideast peace conference
21st-century diplomatic conferences
2007 in international relations
2007 in Maryland
2007 in the Palestinian territories
2007 conferences
Two-state solution